PA-RISC is an instruction set architecture (ISA) developed by Hewlett-Packard. As the name implies, it is a reduced instruction set computer (RISC) architecture, where the PA stands for Precision Architecture. The design is also referred to as HP/PA for Hewlett Packard Precision Architecture.

The architecture was introduced on 26 February 1986, when the HP 3000 Series 930 and HP 9000 Model 840 computers were launched featuring the first implementation, the TS1.

PA-RISC has been succeeded by the Itanium (originally IA-64) ISA, jointly developed by HP and Intel. HP stopped selling PA-RISC-based HP 9000 systems at the end of 2008 but supported servers running PA-RISC chips until 2013.

History
In the late 1980s, HP was building four series of computers, all based on CISC CPUs. One line was the IBM PC compatible Intel i286-based Vectra Series, started in 1986. All others were non-Intel systems. One of them was the HP Series 300 of Motorola 68000-based workstations, another Series 200 line of technical workstations based on a custom silicon on sapphire (SOS) chip design, the SOS based 16-bit HP 3000 classic series, and finally the HP 9000 Series 500 minicomputers, based on their own (16- and 32-bit) FOCUS microprocessor.

The Precision Architecture is the result of what was known inside Hewlett-Packard as the Spectrum program. HP planned to use Spectrum to move all of their non-PC compatible machines to a single RISC CPU family.

Work began on the Precision Architecture at HP Laboratories in early 1982 defining the instruction set and virtual memory system, and the first TTL implementation began in April 1983, with simulation of the processor occurring in 1983, and with a complete processor delivered to software developers in July 1984. Systems prototyping followed, with "lab prototypes" being produced in 1985 and product prototypes in 1986.

The first processors were introduced in products during 1986. It has thirty-two 32-bit integer registers and sixteen 64-bit floating-point registers. The number of floating-point registers was doubled in the 1.1 version to 32 once it became apparent that 16 were inadequate and restricted performance. The architects included Allen Baum, Hans Jeans, Michael J. Mahon, Ruby Bei-Loh Lee, Russel Kao, Steve Muchnick, Terrence C. Miller, David Fotland, and William S. Worley.

The first implementation was the TS1, a central processing unit built from discrete transistor–transistor logic (74F TTL) devices. Later implementations were multi-chip VLSI designs fabricated in NMOS processes (NS1 and NS2) and CMOS (CS1 and PCX).
They were first used in a new series of HP 3000 machines in the late 1980s – the 930 and 950, commonly known at the time as Spectrum systems, the name given to them in the development labs. These machines ran MPE-XL. The HP 9000 machines were soon upgraded with the PA-RISC processor as well, running the HP-UX version of UNIX.

Other operating systems ported to the PA-RISC architecture include Linux, OpenBSD, NetBSD and NeXTSTEP.

An interesting aspect of the PA-RISC line is that most of its generations have no Level 2 cache. Instead large Level 1 caches are used, formerly as separate chips connected by a bus, and now integrated on-chip. Only the PA-7100LC and PA-7300LC have L2 caches. Another innovation of the PA-RISC is the addition of vector instructions (SIMD) in the form of MAX, which were first introduced on the PA-7100LC.

Precision RISC Organization, an industry group led by HP, was founded in 1992, to promote the PA-RISC architecture.  Members included Convex, Hitachi, Hughes Aircraft, Mitsubishi, NEC, OKI, Prime, Stratus, Yokogawa, Red Brick Software, and Allegro Consultants, Inc.

The ISA was extended in 1996 to 64 bits, with this revision named PA-RISC 2.0. PA-RISC 2.0 also added fused multiply–add instructions, which help certain floating-point intensive algorithms, and the MAX-2 SIMD extension, which provides instructions for accelerating multimedia applications. The first PA-RISC 2.0 implementation was the PA-8000, which was introduced in January 1996.

CPU specifications

See also
 Amiga Hombre chipset – A PA-7150-based chipset with a complete multimedia system for Commodore Amiga

References

External links
 LostCircuits Hewlett Packard PA8800 RISC Processor overview
 HP's documentation – page down for PA-RISC, architecture PDFs available
 OpenPA.net Comprehensive PA-RISC chip and computer information
 chipdb.org Images of different PA-RISC processors

HP microprocessors
Instruction set architectures
Computer-related introductions in 1986